Jake Wade may refer to:
Jake Wade (baseball) (1912–2006), MLB pitcher
Jake Wade, main character in The Law and Jake Wade, a 1958 western by John Sturges

See also
Jake Wade and the Soul Searchers, a funk band